The 2003 Vuelta a España was the 58th edition of the Vuelta a España, one of cycling's Grand Tours. The Vuelta began in Gijón, with a team time trial on 6 September, and Stage 11 occurred on 17 September with a stage to Cuenca. The race finished in Madrid on 28 September.

Stage 1
6 September 2003 — Gijón to Gijón,  (TTT)

Stage 2
7 September 2003 — Gijón to Cangas de Onís,

Stage 3
8 September 2003 — Cangas de Onís to Santander,

Stage 4
9 September 2003 — Santander to Burgos,

Stage 5
10 September 2003 — Soria to Zaragoza,

Stage 6
11 September 2003 — Zaragoza to Zaragoza,

Stage 7
12 September 2003 — Huesca to Cauterets,

Stage 8
13 September 2003 — Cauterets to Pla de Beret/Val d'Aran,  (ITT)

Stage 9
14 September 2003 — Vielha to Envalira,

Stage 10
15 September 2003 — Andorra to Sabadell,

Stage 11
17 September 2003 — Utiel to Cuenca,

References

2003 Vuelta a España
Vuelta a España stages